
Accidents and incidents involving the Ilyushin Il-18
Data from:Aviation Safety Network Il-18

1958
7 May A Soviet Air Force Il-18A (CCCP-Л5821, c/n 188000104) crashed near Sheremetyevo Airport after an engine failed while on a test flight, killing all 10 on board in the first loss of an Il-18. The aircraft was operating for Aviatsionnaya Krasnoznamyonnaya Diviziya Osobogo Naznacheniya (AKDON, Red Banner Special Task Aviation Division).

1959
2 September Aeroflot Flight 249, an Il-18B (CCCP-75676, c/n 189000905), from Vnukovo Airport was written off after suffering structural damage in a cumulonimbus cloud while flying over Voronezh Region; all 65 passengers and crew survived.

1960
27 April An Aeroflot/Ural Il-18A, CCCP-75648 (c/n 188000402), crashed on landing at Koltsovo Airport while on a training flight due to crew error, killing one of five crew on board.
17 August Aeroflot Flight 036, an Il-18B (CCCP-75705, c/n 189001702), crashed near Tarasovich, Kiev Oblast due to loss of control following an in-flight fire, killing all 34 passengers and crew on board; the fire was caused by a leaking fuel injector in engine four.
26 December An Aeroflot/Ulyanovsk Flight School Il-18A (CCCP-75651, c/n 188000405) lost control and crashed near Vostochny Airport en route from Kuybyshev Airport while on a training flight due to tail icing, killing all 17 passengers and crew on board. Test flights later showed that the Il-18 was prone to loss of control in icing conditions.

1961
28 March ČSA Flight 511, an Il-18V (OK-OAD, c/n 180002102), crashed near Gräfenberg, Bavaria in West Germany. All 52 passengers and crew on board were killed.
22 June An Aeroflot/Moscow Il-18B, CCCP-75672 (c/n 189000901), en route from Vnukovo Airport to Adler/Sochi Airport, suffered a generator failure on no.3 engine and subsequent fire, force-landing in a field near Bogoroditsk, Tula Oblast with no casualties among the 97 occupants. (1961 Bogoroditsk Il-18 incident)
12 July ČSA Flight 511, an Il-18V (OK-PAF, c/n 181002904), crashed near Casablanca, Morocco, killing all 72 on board; the cause was not determined, but weather may have been a factor.
28 July An Il-18V (CCCP-75766, c/n 181003405) of MAP Plant No. 30 crashed at Tretyakovo Airport during a pre-delivery test flight for Aeroflot due to engine failure; the aircraft was on a test flight with the number two engine shut down when the number one engine failed, causing the aircraft to bank left; the left wing hit the ground and the aircraft crashed with no casualties.
13 August An Aeroflot/Ulyanovsk Flight School Il-18B, CCCP-75653 (c/n 188000502) overshot the runway in poor visibility at Riga Central Airport, Latvia, with no casualties.
17 December Aeroflot Flight 245, an Il-18B (CCCP-75654, c/n 188000503), went into a dive and crashed near Chebotovka, Rostov Oblast after the flight engineer accidentally deployed the flaps, killing all 59 passengers and crew on board.
31 December An Aeroflot/Armenia Il-18V (CCCP-75757, c/n 181003202) crashed near Mineralnye Vody Airport while attempting a go-around during a charter flight, killing 32 of 119 on board. The aircraft was one of two sent to pick up people who had been stranded at Tbilisi due to bad weather.

1962
24 February A TAROM Il-18V (YR-IMB, c/n 181003702) belly landed near Paphos, Cyprus, after all 4 engines failed, perhaps due to fuel filter icing, (see List of airline flights that required gliding).
23 November Malév Hungarian Airlines Flight 355, an Il-18V (HA-MOD, c/n 180002002) stalled for reasons unknown and crashed near Le Bourget Airport, killing all 21 passengers and crew on board.
29 November An Aeroflot/Moscow Ilyushin Il-18V, CCCP-75843 (c/n 182005303), was reported to have crashed on this date, with no further information available.

1963
26 February An Aeroflot/Polar Il-18V (CCCP-75732, c/n 181002601) force-landed on the ice of the Shelikhov Gulf near Bukhta Yemlinskaya due to double engine failure, killing all 10 passengers and crew on board; three initially survived the crash, but later died of hypothermia in the subzero temperatures.
5 March Aeroflot Flight 191, an Il-18V (CCCP-75765, c/n 181003404), crashed short of the runway at Ashgabat Airport due to poor visibility caused by a dust storm, killing 12 of 54 on board.
4 April Aeroflot Flight 25, an Il-18V (CCCP-75866, c/n 183005901), crashed near Urakhcha, Tatarstan after the propeller pitch control mechanism on an engine malfunctioned, killing all 67 passengers and crew on board.
10 November An Aeroflot/Uzbekistan Il-18B, CCCP-75686 (c/n 189001201), crashed on landing at Kuibyshev Airport en route from Tashkent due to pilot error; no casualties.

1964
2 July An Aeroflot/Moscow Il-18B (CCCP-75661, c/n 188000605) was written off at Krasnodar Airport.	 
3 August An Aeroflot/Far East Il-18V (CCCP-75824, c/n 182004903) was written off after landing short and the undercarriage collapsing at Magadan Airport.
2 September Aeroflot Flight 721, an Il-18V (CCCP-75531, c/n 183006904), struck a hillside near Yuzhno-Sakhalinsk Airport after the crew descended too soon, killing 87 of 93 on board.
19 October A Soviet Air Force Il-18V (CCCP-75568, c/n 183005704) struck Mount Avala while on approach to Batajnica Air Base, killing all 33 passengers and crew on board.

1965
4 January Aeroflot Flight 20/101, an Il-18B (CCCP-75685, c/n 189001105), crashed short of the runway at Alma-Ata Airport in poor visibility, killing 64 of 103 on board.

1966
27 March A Cubana Il-18B (CU-T831, c/n 182005202) from Santiago-Antonio Maceo Airport to José Martí International Airport was hijacked by the flight engineer, demanding to be flown to Florida. Two people were killed during the incident.
7 July A Cubana Il-18 flying from Antonio Maceo Airport to José Martí International Airport, was hijacked by 9 hijackers, including the pilot, and flown to Jamaica.
10 July A Cubana Ilyushin Il-18V (CU-T830, c/n 182004905) made a forced landing at Cienfuegos due to multiple engine failure, killing two of 93 on board.
27 August Aeroflot Flight 3772, an Il-18V (CCCP-75552, c/n 184007404) flying from Talaghy Airport to Shosseynaya Airport, overran the runway after an aborted take-off with the rudder gust-lock engaged; all 121 passengers and crew on board survived.
22 November Aeroflot Flight X-19, an Il-18B (CCCP-75665, c/n 188000704), left the runway and crashed on takeoff from Alma-Ata Airport, killing three of 68 on board.
24 November TABSO Flight 101 crashed near Bratislava; killing all 82 passengers and crew on board; the cause was not determined, but crew error was blamed. The crash remains Slovakia's worst air disaster.

1967
4 January A Hâng Không Viêtnam Ilyushin Il-18D (c/n 186008804) from Nanking Airport was reported to have crashed.
6 April An Aeroflot/235 Aviation Det. Il-18V (CCCP-75563, c/n 184007802) was being ferried from Domodedovo Airport to Vnukovo Airport when it crashed on climbout, killing all eight crew on board.
9 July An Air Guinee Il-18V (3X-GAB, c/n 181003703) on a flight to Praha-Ruzyne International Airport in Czechoslovakia, diverted to Casablanca-Anfa Airport, Morocco due to bad weather, but hit a building on landing and was damaged beyond repair, with no casualties among the 102 occupants.
5 September ČSA Flight 523, an Il-18D (OK-WAI, c/n 187009705), crashed shortly after takeoff from Gander, Newfoundland, Canada. Thirty-seven of the 69 passengers and crew aboard were killed; the cause was never determined.

1968
9 January An Aeroflot/Northern Il-18V (CCCP-75519, c/n 183006702) was damaged beyond repair when it landed  short of the runway at Karaganda Airport.
24 February An Aeroflot/Ural Il-18V (CCCP-75560, c/n 184007704) overran the runway at Donetsk Airport and was damaged beyond repair.
29 February Aeroflot Flight 15, an Il-18D (CCCP-74252, c/n 187010601), broke apart at 10,000 feet and crashed near Parchum, Irkutsk due to a possible fuel leak and fire, killing 83 of 84 on board.
22 April An Aeroflot Il-18V (CCCP-75526, c/n 183006804) struck power lines and crashed near Domodedovo Airport while on a training flight, killing all five crew on board.
3 September A Bulair Il-18E (LZ-BEG, c/n 186009101) crashed near Bourgas Airport after the crew deviated from flight rules to attempt a visual approach in bad weather, killing 47 of 89 on board.
20 October An Aeroflot/West Siberia Il-18D (CCCP-75436, c/n 186009505) on a scheduled flight from Novosibirsk-Tolmachevo Airport to Yakutsk Airport, diverted to Krasnoyarsk Airport, due to weather. The aircraft landed hard  short of the runway causing the fuselage to break and a fire to erupt. No casualties were reported but the aircraft was damaged beyond repair.

1969
20 March A United Arab Airlines Il-18 crashed while attempting to land at Aswan International Airport. One hundred of the 105 passengers and crew on board were killed.
26 August Aeroflot Flight 1770, an Il-18B (CCCP-75708, c/n 189001705) landed on its belly at Vnukovo Airport after the crew forgot to lower the landing gear, killing 16 of 102 on board.
10 September Aeroflot Flight 93, an Il-18V (CCCP-75791, c/n 181004005) on a flight from Krasnoyarsk Airport to Yakutsk Airport, was written off at Yakutsk after striking an ambulance crossing the runway.
11 November An Aeroflot/Ural Il-18B (CCCP-75669, c/n 188000803) was written off after flying in heavy turbulence. The fuselage was used to rebuild Il-18 CCCP-74297 (c/n 184007203) after it was damaged in a fire at ARZ-402.

1970
6 February Aeroflot Flight U-45, an Il-18V (CCCP-75798), struck a mountain en route to Samarkand from Tashkent, killing 92 of 106 on board.
5 June An Aeroflot/Uzbekistan Il-18V (CCCP-75533, c/n 180002502) crashed on take-off at Samarkand Airport with a locked rudder.
23 August Aeroflot Flight 17, an Il-18V (CCCP-75823), was written off after a hard landing at Yuzhno-Sakhalinsk Airport.
16 October An Aeroflot/Armenia Il-18V (CCCP-75578, c/n 185008102) overran the runway on landing at Simferopol Airport, Ukraine following engine failure; no casualties.
31 December Aeroflot Flight 3012, an Il-18V (CCCP-75773), crashed on climb-out from Pulkovo Airport after the crew forgot to select the flaps before takeoff, killing six of 86 on board.

1971
18 January A Balkan Bulgarian Airlines Il-18D (LZ-BED, c/n 186009002) crashed on approach to Kloten Airport after the pilot attempted to correct the glide path, killing 45 of 47 on board.
The aircraft was written off due to severe structural damage it suffered during the dive.
22 August A United Arab Airlines Il-18 flying from Cairo International Airport to Amman-Marka International Airport was hijacked by a lone hijacker who demanded to be taken to Israel.
28 August Malév Flight 731, an Il-18 (HA-MOC, c/n 181002903), crashed into the sea near Copenhagen while executing an instrument approach. The main cause of the accident was a microburst, a particularly dangerous and unpredictable meteorological phenomenon. Twenty-three passengers and the crew of 9 died, two passengers survived. The captain of the aircraft was Dezső Szentgyörgyi, a World War II flying ace of the Royal Hungarian Air Force, who was due to retire less than 3 weeks after the date of the accident.
21 December A Balkan Bulgarian Airlines Il-18V (LZ-BES, c/n 185008104) crashed shortly after take-off from Sofia-Vrazhdebna Airport, Bulgaria, en route to Algiers-Dar el Beida Airport, Algeria. Twenty-eight of the 73 occupants were killed.
23 December A Malév Il-18D (HA-MOI, c/n 187010002) on a scheduled flight from Nicosia Airport, Cyprus, to Damascus International Airport, Syria, made contact with a  hill whilst on approach to Damascus. Control of the aircraft was retained and a safe landing was made.

1972
26 August An Aeroflot/Northern Il-18B (CCCP-75663, c/n 188000702) was damaged beyond repair after it crashed on landing in fog at Talaghy Airport.
31 August Aeroflot Flight 558, an Il-18V (CCCP-74298), crashed near Smelovskiy, Chelyabinsk Oblast after a loss of control following a fire in the baggage compartment, killing all 102 passengers and crew on board.
1 October Aeroflot Flight 1036 (an Il-18V, CCCP-75507), crashed in the Black Sea shortly after takeoff from Adler/Sochi Airport, killing all 109 passengers and crew on board.

1973
29 January EgyptAir Flight 741 crashed in the Kyrenia mountain range, Cyprus while on approach to Nicosia International Airport, killing all 37 passengers and crew on board.
3 March Balkan Bulgarian Airlines Flight 307 (an Il-18, LZ-BEM) lost control and crashed near Skhodnya, Moscow while on approach to Sheremetyevo International Airport, killing all 25 passengers and crew on board; tail icing was suspected.
11 May Aeroflot Flight 6551 (an Il-18B, CCCP-75687) crashed 53 mi S of Semipalatinsk due to an in-flight breakup following an unexplained descent, killing all 63 passengers and crew on board.

1974
27 April An Aeroflot/Leningrad Il-18V (CCCP-75559) crashed shortly after takeoff from Pulkovo Airport due to loss of control following an uncontained engine failure, killing all 109 passengers and crew on board.
9 May An Aeroflot/Ural Il-18V (CCCP-75425, c/n 181003403) on a domestic scheduled passenger flight to Ivano-Frankivsk International Airport, Ukraine en route from Sverdlovsk was damaged beyond repair after landing on a short runway, overrunning into a ravine.
24 June Aeroflot Flight 5139, an Il-18E (CCCP-75405, c/n 186009005), suffered a bird strike on the number one engine during takeoff from Tashkent-Yuzhny Airport, Uzbekistan. The aircraft was unable to climb and crashed killing one passenger out of 114 occupants.
11 August An Air Mali Il-18V (TZ-ABE, c/n 181003304) on an unscheduled Hajj passenger flight from Bamako Airport, Mali to Niamey Airport, Niger, was damaged beyond repair in a forced landing after a navigational error. The aircraft ran out of fuel and force-landed near Linoghin, Burkina Faso, killing 47 of the 60 occupants.
9 December A Tarom (but operating for EgyptAir) Il-18D YR-IMK (c/n 186009104) from Jeddah International Airport to Cairo International Airport on a training flight, crashed into the Red Sea killing the 9 crew members.

1975
15 January Malév Flight 801 (an Il-18V, HA-MOH) was being ferried from East Berlin to Budapest when it crashed on approach to Ferihegy Airport due to weather, poor visibility, poor CRM and possible spatial disorientation, killing the nine crew.
12 February An Aeroflot/Moscow Il-18V (CCCP-75801, c/n 182004301) was damaged beyond repair after undershooting the runway at Krasnoyarsk Airport.

1976
30 January An Aeroflot/Kyrgyzstan Il-18V (CCCP-75558, c/n 184007505) on a training flight, crashed near Frunze Airport, after the number three engine failed to restart after un-feathering, during a go-around with the right side engines shut down. All 6 crew-members were killed.
6 March Aeroflot Flight 909 (an Il-18E, CCCP-75408, c/n 186009201) crashed near Verkhnyaya Khava, Russia due to loss of control following an electrical failure, killing all 111 passengers and crew in the worst-ever accident involving the Il-18.
28 July ČSA Flight 001 crashed during a flight from Ruzyně Airport; during the approach, the crew accidentally set both inboard engines to reverse thrust, and this caused engine three to fail. The crew inadvertently shut down engine four (which was on the same wing as engine 3). This caused the aircraft to veer to the right during the emergency landing at Ivanka Airport in Bratislava, crashing into the Zlaté Piesky lake, killing 70 passengers and 6 out of 9 crew members. Five crew members were saved right after the crash but two died later in hospital due to kerosene poisoning.
28 October A CSA Il-18 with 105 occupants on a domestic flight from Ruzyne International Airport to Ivanka Airport was hijacked and flown to Munich in West Germany where the hijacker surrendered.
30 October An Aeroflot/Uzbekistan Il-18V (CCCP-75575, c/n 185008004) overshot the runway at Tashkent Airport in bad weather; all 97 on board survived.
December A Balkan Bulgarian Airlines Il-18V (LZ-BEL, c/n 182004601) burned out in a fire at an overhaul plant at Tashkent Airport, Uzbekistan.

1977
2 January A CSA Il-18V (OK-NAA, c/n 189001604) was struck during takeoff by a CSA Tupolev Tu-134 which was landing at Ruzyne International Airport. None of the 6 occupants of the Il-18 were killed and the aircraft was repaired and returned to service. After it was withdrawn from use in 1981, the Il-18 was transferred to the Prague Aviation Museum.
15 February Aeroflot Flight 5003, an Il-18V (CCCP-75520), stalled and crashed near Mineralnye Vody when the crew performed a missed approach, killing all 77 of the 98 people aboard.
February A CAAC Airlines Il-18B (B-204, c/n 189001602) was written off at Shenyang Airport.
21 April A Tarom Il-18V (YR-IMI) crashed during a touch-and-go landing at Bucharest Otopeni International Airport.
23 November Malév Hungarian Airlines Flight 203, an Il-18V (HA-MOF, c/n 183006301) on a scheduled flight from Yesilköy Airport to Bucharest Otopeni International Airport, was written off after colliding with two trucks after landing at Bucharest in rain. The truck drivers were in the wrong place.

1978
6 May An Aeroflot Il-18 flying from Ashgabat to Mineralyne Vody was hijacked by a man demanding to be flown to Iran. Armed with a homemade pistol and a training grenade, the hijacker shot the co-pilot and was then shot and killed by security guards. The aircraft was able to return safely to Ashgabat.
10 May A CSA Il-18 flying from Ruzyne International Airport to Brno Turany Airport in Czechoslovakia was hijacked and flown to Frankfurt in Germany, where the hijackers surrendered.
3 September An Air Guinee Il-18D (3X-GAX, c/n 187009803) from Moscow to Conakry Airport, Guinea, crashed into marshland near Conakry, killing 15 out of a total of 17 occupants.

1979
26 March An Interflug Il-18D (DM-STL, c/n 186009402) aborted take-off at Luanda-Quatro de Fevereiro Airport after the number two engine failed, overrunning the runway, striking the ILS localiser and bursting into flames, killing all 10 occupants.
10 May An Aeroflot/Ural Il-18D (CCCP-75414, c/n 186009303) crashed after an aborted take-off at Adler/Sochi Airport.

1980
30 January Two men attempted to hijack an Interflug Il-18 flying from Erfurt Airport to East Berlin but were overpowered by crew and passengers.

1981
26 March A Hàng Không Việtnam Il-18D (VN-B190?, c/n 188010703) was reported to have crashed at Hoa Binh, Vietnam.

1982
25 July CAAC Flight 2505, an Il-18 (B-220, c/n 187009605) flying a scheduled passenger service from Xi'an Xiguan Airport to Shanghai-Hongqiao Airport, China was hijacked by five men armed with knives and a bomb demanding to be flown to Taiwan, although they later agreed to be flown to Hong Kong as the aircraft did not have enough fuel to reach Taiwan. During the ordeal, the co-pilot and navigator were wounded and were allowed to move to the rear of the aircraft to use the medical kit, but while there, they organized two groups of passengers who overpowered the hijackers and five additional people were injured in the process. The bomb was thrown and went off, blowing a hole in the fuselage, but no depressurization occurred. The aircraft landed at Shanghai with two engines flamed out.
25 August A LOT Polish Airlines Il-18E (SP-LSI, c/n 186008905) operating a flight from Budapest Ferihegy Airport to Okecie Airport, was diverted to Munich-Riem Airport in Germany by two male hijackers.
24 December CAAC Flight 2311, an Il-18B (B-202, c/n 189001401), burned out on the runway at Guangzhou-Baiyun Airport after a passenger's cigarette started a fire, killing 24 of 69 on board.

1984
16 June A Balkan Bulgarian Airlines Il-18V (LZ-BEP, c/n 185008105), was damaged beyond repair after a failed landing at Sana'a International Airport.

1985
19 January A Cubana Il-18D (CU-T899, c/n 188011102) lost control and crashed near San José de las Lajas after the cargo shifted, killing all 38 passengers and crew on board.

1988
18 January China Southwest Airlines Flight 4146 (an Il-18D, B-222) crashed while on approach to Chongqing Airport due to loss of control caused by an engine fire, killing all 108 passengers and crew on board.

1990
23 August A Soviet Navy Il-20 (c/n 173011403) failed to take off from Kacha Air Base, Ukraine; the crew aborted takeoff but the aircraft could not be stopped in time and veered off the runway and broke apart. All crew escaped unhurt; the crew had forgotten to unlock the rudder before takeoff.

1991
13 August A Tarom Il-18V (YR-IMH, c/n 185008301) crashed near Uricani, Romania after the crew descended too soon, killing all nine passengers and crew on board.

1992
15 November An Aerocaribbean Il-18D (CU-T1270, c/n 187010301) struck Pico Isabel de Torres near San Felipe de Puerto Plata, while on approach to Gregorio Luperón International Airport, Dominican Republic, for an intermediate stop, killing all 34 passengers and crew on board.

1995
January A Kazakhstan Government Ilyushin Il-22M (UN-75915, c/n 2964111701) was written off after a ground collision with an Antonov An-12 at Almaty Airport.

1997

17 December Ramaer Cargo Flight 202, an Il-18GrM (RA-75554, c/n 185008404) from Johannesburg International Airport, to Bujumbura International Airport, Burundi, was written off after an aborted take-off due to an incorrect center of gravity.

1998
23 November An Air Cess Ilyushin Il-18Gr (3D-SBZ, c/n 188010903) was strafed on the ground by fighters from the Zimbabwe Air Force at Kalemie Airport, Democratic Republic of Congo.

2000
25 October Russian Air Force Il-18D RA-74295 struck Mount Mtirala, in the Meskheti Range, while on approach to Chorokh Airport due to crew and ATC errors, killing all 84 passengers and crew on board.

2001

19 November An IRS Aero Il-18V (RA-75840) crashed near Kalyazin after the elevator control system malfunctioned, killing all 27 passengers and crew on board.

2002
15 September A Phoenix Aviation Il-18V (EX-904, c/n 182004904) overran the runway on landing at Nzagi Airport, Angola; no casualties.
15 September An IRS Aero Il-18V (RA-75423, c/n 182005601) overran the runway on landing at Bykovo Airport, suffering substantial damage; the aircraft was repaired and returned to service.
1 October Two Indian Navy Il-38s (IN-302 and IN-304) collided in mid-air near Gabolim Airport following a flyover in practice for the 25th anniversary celebration of the Goa naval air squadron, killing all 12 on board both aircraft; the crash of IN-302 also killed three people on the ground.

2004
27 January A Renan Il-18D (ER-ICJ, c/n 186009102), overshot the runway on takeoff from Luena Airport, Angola; all 18 on board survived.
4 February Expo Aviation Flight 3002, an Il-18D (EX-005, c/n 188011105) leased from Phoenix Air, struck the water while on approach to Bandaranaike International Airport. Climb power was applied and the crew reported they were performing a go-around, but at a height of  the pilot decided to continue the approach. Fearing that the landing gear was damaged, the pilot belly-landed the aircraft next to the runway. All seven crew survived; the co-pilot had programmed the altimeter incorrectly.
6 March Aerocaribbean Flight 4317, an Il-18D (CU-T1532, c/n 188010904), was written off after the number four engine caught fire during the takeoff roll at Frank Pais Airport, Cuba; all on board were able to evacuate the aircraft.

2005
28 March Aerocaribbean Flight 4311, an Il-18D (CU-T1539, c/n 2964017102) overran the runway after failing to take off from Simon Bolivar Airport, Venezuela; all 97 on board survived.

2016
19 December Russian Air Force Il-18V RF-91821 crash-landed in Yakutia, Siberia, during severe weather conditions, seriously injuring 16. The crew deviated from the approach pattern and began descending until the wings hit the top of a  snow-covered hill in the tundra.

2018
17 September Russian Air Force Il-20M RF-93610 with 14 people on board was shot down near Latakia, Syria. Later reports showed that Syria accidentally shot down the aircraft.

Notes

References

Ilyushin Il-18

Accidents and incidents involving airliners